In 2010, there were an estimated 6,000 Muslims in Slovakia representing fewer than 0.1% of the country's population.

History

Decades after the Hungarian defeat of Mohacs (1526) Turkish troops controlled Štúrovo (Párkány) and other parts of today's southern central Slovakia and encouraged the Protestant Christian groups while Habsburg Austrian troops occupied and recatholized the northern and western parts. Later on the Turks seized some further territories in southern central Slovakia and pillaged in territories up to Nitra.  Finally, however, when the Turks lost the Battle of Vienna and  the Ottoman vassal Emeric Thököly was defeated in Slovakia, between 1687 and 1699 Turkish Ottoman rule in Hungary was finally broken.

Muslim demographics
Slovakia is the only member state of the European Union without a mosque. In 2000, a dispute about the building of an Islamic center in Bratislava erupted: the capital's mayor refused such attempts of the Slovak Islamic Waqfs Foundation.

On 30 November 2016, Slovakia passed legislation to effectively block Islam from gaining official status as a religion in the country.

Islamic Center of Cordoba in Bratislava

Islamic Center of Cordoba (Kultúrne Centrum Córdoba), is located down the Obchodná street, Bratislava. It is the only place of Muslim worship in the country under Islamic foundation in Slovakia. Even though it is an unofficial Mosque, it is open every day of the year for all daily prayers except the Fajr prayer. Friday sermon is held in Arabic, English, and Slovak, and starts Friday at 01:00 pm. The center is not very big, but it is enough to hold congregation prayers of about 80 to 100 people. There is a wooden podium that is used for Friday sermons, but there is no decoration with elaborated patterns as found in common mosques. The Kultúrne Centrum Córdoba has tried to attain an official mosque permit from the government, but had its proposal rejected.

Gallery

References

External links
Muslims in Slovakia work for positive integration
Protestants and Muslims without legal status

 
Slovakia